John Floyd Tucker (born October 24, 1940) is a former Canadian politician. He represented the electoral district of Colchester in the Nova Scotia House of Assembly from 1974 to 1978. He was a member of the Nova Scotia Liberal Party.

Tucker was born in New Annan in Colchester County, Nova Scotia. He attended Dalhousie University, and later was a pharmacist. In 1968, he married Janet Lorraine Densmore.

References

1940 births
Living people
Nova Scotia Liberal Party MLAs
People from Colchester County
Dalhousie University alumni